This is a list of notable temples in Taiwan associated with Chinese folk religion, mostly Buddhism, Taoism, and Confucianism. Religious affiliation is based on what each temple registered as to the Ministry of the Interior, though temples often incorporate elements from other sects.

Northern Taiwan

Taipei City

Keelung City

New Taipei City

Taoyuan City

Hsinchu City

Hsinchu County

Miaoli County

Central Taiwan

Taichung City

Changhua County

Nantou County

Yunlin County

Southern Taiwan

Chiayi City

Chiayi County

Tainan City

Kaohsiung City

Pingtung County

Eastern Taiwan

Yilan County

Hualien County

Taitung County

Outlying Islands

Penghu County

Kinmen County

Lienchiang County

References 

Temples